The Ven Edmund John Warlow was Archdeacon of Lahore from 1912 to 1916.

Career
Warlow was educated at Corpus Christi College, Cambridge and ordained Deacon in 1886 and Priest in 1887.  He was  Curate at Stratton St Margaret  and then St Saviour, Paddington. He went out to the North Western Frontier Province in 1889. He was at Dagshai, Ambala, Jullundur, Quetta, Murree, Umballa and Shimla before his time as Archdeacon; and at Brampford Speke and Venice afterwards.

Notes

Alumni of Corpus Christi College, Cambridge
Christianity in Lahore
Archdeacons of Lahore